Wolfgang Bernhard Fränkel (Bonn, 11 November 1795; Elberfeld - 5 March 1851) was a German physician and writer. He participated in the Napoleonic wars, starting 1812 in the Napoleoneon army, later as a lieutenant in the  anti-Napoleon-coalition. Later he studied at the gymnasium and the University of Bonn and became doctor of medicine in 1824. He then became a physician in Elberfeld until his death. 1840 he converted to the Christian religion. His son was the physician and professor Bernhard Fränkel

Works 
Ueber die wichtigsten Gegenstände des ehelichen Lebens, Elberfeld und Barmen 1829
Die Flechten und Ihre Behandlung, Elberfeld 1830
Das Bekenntniss des Proselyten, das Unglück der Juden und Ihre Emancipation in Deutschland, Elberfeld 1841
Die Unmöglichkeit der Emancipation der Juden im Christlichen Staat, Elberfeld 1841
Die Rabbiner-Versammlung und der Reform-Verein, Elberfeld 1844

Links 
Article in the Jewish Encyklopedia 1906
online edition of Das Bekenntnis des Proselyten

1795 births
1851 deaths
19th-century German physicians

University of Bonn alumni
18th-century German Jews
German male writers
People from Bonn